Hesarak or Hisarak may refer to:

Afghanistan
Hisarak District, Nangarhar Province
Hesarak, Nangarhar, a village in the District

Iran
Hesarak (Karaj), Iran

See also
Hesar (disambiguation)
Hissar (disambiguation)